Gaddafi Stadium hosted 40 Test matches, the first of these was in 1959 when Pakistan played the touring Australian side. The ground has also hosted 60 One Day Internationals (ODIs), the first was in 1978 between Pakistan and England.

In 1959 Australian Norm O'Neill became the first player to score a Test Century at the ground, 134 runs against Pakistan. Inzamam-ul-Haq holds the record for the highest individual innings at the ground, 329. His innings, made against New Zealand in 2002, is the only triple century at the ground. Mohammad Yousuf holds the record for most centuries scored at by an individual player with 5.

40 ODI centuries have been scored at Gaddafi Stadium. Zaheer Abbas became the first player to score an ODI century at the ground. He scored 123 against Sri Lanka in 1982. Ijaz Ahmed holds the record for highest ODI score at the ground with 139 not out.

One T20I century has been scored at the Gaddafi Stadium, when Mohammad Rizwan scored 104* against South Africa in February 2021.

The stadium also maintains an honor board.

Key
 * denotes that the batsman was not out.
 Inns. denotes the number of the innings in the match.
 Balls denotes the number of balls faced in an innings.
 NR denotes that the number of balls was not recorded.
 Parentheses next to the player's score denotes his century number at Gaddafi Stadium.
 The column title Date refers to the date the match started.
 The column title Result refers to whether the player's team won, lost or if the match was drawn.

Test centuries

The following table summarises the Test centuries scored at Gaddafi Stadium.

One Day International centuries

The following table summarises the One Day International centuries scored at Gaddafi Stadium.

Twenty20 International centuries

The following table summarises the Twenty20 International centuries scored at Gaddafi Stadium.

References 

Gaddafi
Cricket grounds in Pakistan
Centuries
Cricket in Lahore